George Bagamuhunda is an Anglican bishop in Uganda: From 2014 to 2022 he served as the Bishop of Kigezi. He handed over office to The Rt Rev Gaddie Akanjuna who was consecrated on 29 May 2022 at a service held at Kigezi High School

References

21st-century Anglican bishops in Uganda
Anglican bishops of Kigezi
Year of birth missing (living people)
Living people
Uganda Christian University alumni